Grünspan or Gruenspan is a Yiddish surname (from the German word meaning green swarf, verdigris) spelled Grynszpan in Polish, in English speaking countries anglicized to  Greenspan. It may refer to, alphabetically:

 Herschel Grünspan (1921–before 1945), Germanized spelling of Herschel Grynszpan

See also
 Greenspan, anglicized version of the surname
 Grynszpan, Polish version of the surname

Jewish surnames
German-language surnames
Yiddish-language surnames